Bareiss (full name: Bareiss Prüfgerätebau GmbH) is a German materials testing company founded in 1954 by Heinrich Bareiss. The company specialises in material testing equipment and is headquartered in Oberdischingen, Germany.

Testing Instruments
Bareiss manufactures durometers, automatic hardness testers, temperature-controlled hardness testers, density testers, ball rebound testers, rheology equipment such as rubber process analyzers, and an automated optical inspections system. Most of the product components are manufactured in-house.

Bareiss is also the first DKD calibration laboratory (today: DAkkS laboratory) in Europe, according to DIN EN ISO 17025 for the calibrations of the measurement category of hardness, according to Shore DIN ISO 48-4 and DIN ISO 48-2.

History
Bareiss was founded in 1954 by Heinrich Bareiss to produce mechanical hardness testers. In 1961, their first product, BS-61, was released. Brigitte Wirth and Peter Strobel took over the company 1993. A couple of years later, in 1996, Strobel initiated the accreditation of Bareiss to be an official DKD calibration laboratory. Katrin Shen and Oliver Wirth currently lead the company.

Bareiss has a branch in Shanghai, China, which opened in 2012. In 2018, Bareiss USA was founded. Bareiss opened a third branch in Taiwan in 2020. In 2021, Bareiss North America was founded in Toronto, Canada to manage North American operations. Bareiss also opened branches in Taiwan and in Toronto, Canada in the 2020s.

Bareiss was certified by the German Accreditation Body (former German National Test Authority) to calibrate material testing machines and issue the corresponding DAkkS calibration certificates.

References

External links

Materials testing